Technical Difficulties is the third studio album by heavy metal band Racer X, released on December 8, 1999 through Mercury Records (Japan), and on April 25, 2000 through Shrapnel Records (United States) and Mascot Records (Europe). The album's title track evolved from the introductory song "Metal Dog" on guitarist Paul Gilbert's 1994 instructional video Terrifying Guitar Trip; it later appeared in the 2009 video game Brütal Legend, and was covered by cellist duo 2Cellos on their 2012 album In2ition, for which they also shot a promotional video. "B.R.O." stands for "Bach Rip-Off", a homage to a previous track, "Y.R.O." (Yngwie Rip-Off"), from the band's 1986 debut album Street Lethal.

Track listing

Personnel
Jeff Martin – vocals
Paul Gilbert – guitar, production
Scott Travis – drums
John Alderete – bass
Tom Size – engineering, mixing
Damon Gold – engineering
Steve Hall – mastering

References

External links
In Review: Racer X "Technical Difficulties" at Guitar Nine Records

Racer X (band) albums
1999 albums
Shrapnel Records albums
Mercury Records albums